Vinon is a commune in the Cher department in the Centre-Val de Loire region of France.

Geography
One of fourteen communes whose grapes go to produce Sancerre AOC wine.

Population

Sights
 A church, dating from the fifteenth century.
 The sixteenth-century chateau of Vaufreland.
 A medieval washhouse.

See also
Communes of the Cher department

References

Communes of Cher (department)